John Barton O'Hara (January 13, 1944 – February 22, 1992) was an American football coach. He served as the head football coach at Southwest Texas State University–now known as Texas State University–from 1983 to 1989, compiling a record of 36–41. O'Hara died in 1992 on a Caribbean cruise while he was a member of the University of Iowa coaching staff.

Head coaching record

References

External links
 

1944 births
1992 deaths
Baylor Bears football coaches
Iowa Hawkeyes football coaches
Texas State Bobcats football coaches